Trictrac is a French board game of skill and chance for two players that is played with dice on a game board similar, but not identical, to that of backgammon. It was "the classic tables game" of France in the way that backgammon is in the English-speaking world.

Trictrac's gaming interest lies in its multiple combinations, the importance of decision-making and its comprehensive rules which have been well documented and remained stable since the early 17th century. It requires constant attention from the players whether or not it is their turn. Its vocabulary, which is very rich, frequently occurs in French literature. 

The object of the game is not to get out the men as quickly as possible as in jacquet or backgammon, but to score as many points as possible. The game usually ends before all the men have been borne off. The name is sometimes spelt tric trac or tric-trac.

History 

Trictrac was very popular in France at the royal court and in aristocratic circles in the 17th and 18th centuries. It experienced a renaissance during the Restoration before almost disappearing at the end of the 19th century. It was one of a family of games of skill and chance that included backgammon, then known in France as tous tables, and jacquet, which was much simpler and did not appear until around 1800.

H. J. R. Murray notes trictrac's resemblance to the Spanish laquet in that neither game features captures of opponent pieces.
The oldest treatise on trictrac was written in 1634 by Jollivet, a lawyer at the Parliament of Paris, in order to standardise its rules which had hitherto been handed on by oral tradition. Since then, the rules have remained very stable as evinced by the treatises in the bibliography, only minor changes having been made. One author noted this as early as 1818: "It is common knowledge that it has been played as it is now being played for 150 years, without its rules having undergone significant variations."

The last major treatise was published in 1852.

Origin 
The main sources for determining the origin of trictrac are the treatises published since the 17th century:

Jollivet (1634), in the earliest treatise on the history of the game knew nothing about its age or country of origin:

The anonymous author of the second book on trictrac, published by Charpentier (1698, 1701, 1715) cites two possible countries, France and Germany (in fact, Vienna in Austria) as its origin and comes down in favour of France:

Soumille (1738) and Fallavel (1776) do not tackle the subject nor do Guiton (1816) or Lelasseux-Lafosse who wrote the last major treatise in 1852.

Lepeintre (1818), without providing a source, advances the proposition that trictrac was introduced into France at the beginning of the 16th century:

The treatises on trictrac do not go back before the early 17th century and searches of the literature are hampered by the fact that the word trictrac was also given to the board used for all tables games and modern versions of ancient texts have the word "trictrac" when it did not exist in the originals, any search on the word "trictrac" in its different spellings must be accompanied by that of expressions specific to the game. 

A poem entitled La Friquassée crotestyllonnée, des antiques modernes chansons, the preface of which is dated 1557, notably takes up, sometimes playing on words, a large number of expressions of children's games, practised at the time in Rouen, three of which are also typical of the game of trictrac:

However, these expressions were very common at that time (the first two refer to a deceived husband, the last a prostitute), so the reference to trictrac is not certain. In addition, in 1907 a book was published bringing together in particular group games still played in the Normandy bocage, including the one entitled "Petit jean, Gros Jean, et Margot la fendue" which was played with three counters of wood, one small, one longer and another fork-shaped, and which could well correspond to the one quoted in La Friquassée crotestyllonnée of 1557.

Tic-tac and trictrac 
Tic-tac or tick-tack is a game very close to trictrac, using some of its characteristic situations and features. The movement rules for the men are less restrictive, and points are not scored. As soon as a player achieves a winning game situation that player wins the partie. It is thus a very fast game, a few minutes to a quarter of an hour of playing time, favouring bets and raising.

Jollivet gives it the name of Petit Tricque-Trac  and in contrast that of Grand Tricque-Trac to trictrac. He also writes that the former was not played by the French. It appears to have been played mainly in England where two authors give rules for it in the middle of  the 17th century. Despite the obvious family link between the two games, no source confirms that tic-tac is either the precursor of trictrac or its successor.

Spelling and etymology 

The French word "trictrac" has been variously spelt:  tricque-trac, trique-trac, triquetrac, trictrac and, more rarely, tric trac or tric-trac. Nowadays, only the last three spellings are used, the others having long since fallen into disuse.

As for etymology, today it is widely believed that the word "trictrac" is an onomatopoeia, but this is not universally accepted. Jollivet (1634) considers that the word trictrac is an onomatopoeia before asking the reader to be satisfied with this linguistic origin since "the subject is a game and not a science":

The anonymous author of the second treatise, published by Charpentier (1698, 1701, 1715), prefers a Greek origin, more noble and learned:

Soumille (1738 and 1756), quoting the leading lexicographers, affirms that the word "trictrac" is an onomatopoeia:

Fallavel (1776) is the most direct: "the game draws its name from the noise we make while playing it."

Guiton (1816 and 1822) does not address the subject, while Lepeintre (1818) initially distances himself from the name being an onomatopoeia before adopting it:

Lelasseux-Lafosse (1852), polytechnique lecturer and author of the last important treatise of the 19th century, quotes the two hypotheses previously put forward without taking sides:

In conclusion, there is nothing to support either thesis. While the one on Greek origin appears complex, that of onomatopoeia, although attractive, appears equally uncertain. However, another old meaning of the word trictrac tends to reinforce the onomatopoeia hypothesis, it being also a 17th century name for a driven hunt:

Gaming material 

The equipment needed to play trictrac comprises:

 A board (tablier), similar to that of backgammon, but with twenty-four holes drilled in the rails (bandes) forming the longer edges of the board at the base of each of the twenty-four points (flèches = "arrows") and three more holes in each end rail of the board. The players' side rails each have twelve holes, the end rails only three. The centre bar of the board between the left and right halves is known as the 'bridge' (pont);
 Fifteen black counters (dames noire) and fifteen white counters (dames blanches) called "men" in English sources; 
 Two dice and two dice cups (cornets);
 Three small counters, called jetons de bredouille ("lurch counters");
 Two pegs (fichets) which progress along the twelve holes of the side rails;
 A small flag called the pavilion (pavillon).

The board also bears the name of "trictrac". The French word table was originally used to designate a man in the game. The name dame became commonplace during the 17th century but that of table remained in several expressions in the game.

Rules

Preparation 
The allocation of the men and seating may be by mutual agreement or drawing lots. Once those are decided, the players place their men in three or four piles on their talon on their own side of the board. The player whose talon is to the right moves the men clockwise; the other player moves them anticlockwise. Each player places a peg (fichet) in the hole in the end rail nearest the talon. The flag (pavillon) goes in the hole in the middle, between the two pegs. The three holes in the opposite end rail are not used. The three jetons are lined up against the end rail between the two talons.

Vocabulary 

Numbering of points

The twelve points in front of each player are conventionally numbered: T, and then 1 to 11. Other schemes have been devised to try and make it easier to describe game situations.

Names of points

Certain points have been given names:
 point T: talon;
 point 5: bourgeois corner;
 point 6: sometimes also called bourgeois corner;
 point 7: devil's point;
 point 10: schoolboy's point;
 point 11: rest corner.

Ordinary and return runs

The men travel a circuit, first along the player's side of the board from the talon to the rest corner, then along the opponent's, or adverse, side from the adverse rest corner to the adverse talon, before being borne off the board. Each half of the route has a name:
 Ordinary run (jeu ordinaire): the movement of men along the home side of the board from the talon to the rest corner;
 Return run (jeu de retour): the movement of men along the adverse side of the board from the adverse rest corner to the adverse talon. As soon as a player moves a man onto the opponent's half of the board, that man is on the return run and is said to be 'heading for home' (passer au retour).

To make a point, a half-point, a builder
 To make a point: to have a minimum of two men on the same point. A 'full point' occupied in this way is invulnerable;
 To make a half-point: to have a single man on a point. A half-point is vulnerable;
 Builder (surcase): any additional man added to a full point. A point can hold up to thirteen builders.

Divisions of the board

Each side (compartiment) of a trictrac board has two quadrants or quarters (tables). Each player thus has two home quarters called the:
 Petit Jan: the side with points from T to 5;
 Grand Jan: the side with points from 6 to 11.

Lead 
Two methods were used to determine which of the two players would have the lead: 
 Coup et dés: one of the players threw the dice from the cup against the opposing player's rail, calling "coup et dés". The player nearer the higher die went first, moving his men based on that first die roll. If a doublet was rolled or the two dice were the same distance from a player's rail, the dice were re-rolled in similar fashion. Thus player with the lead could never start with a doublet. However, the first move only required one dice throw.

 Simultaneous roll: each player threw a die or both dice, in turn, and the one with the highest pip count had the lead and re-rolled the two dice for the first move of the partie. This allowed both players the opportunity to start with a doublet, but meant there were three dice throws before the first turn started.

Play 
In turn, each player announces the pips on the dice rolled, then the points scored and finally moves the men. Once a man is touched, the player may not change the announced points and the opponent can 'send him to school' (i.e. award him or her a penalty) for any errors made.

As soon as the men have been moved and before the next turn, the opponent must also score any points due from the current turn. If the opponent miscounts and rolls the dice for the next turn, the first player can send the opponent to school. A dice roll is a 'doublet' (doublet) if the two numbers are the same, and 'singletons' (coup simple) if they are different. Singletons are announced highest number first: e.g. "6 and 4" or "3 and A" (the 1 is always said to be Ace). The doublets have individual names:
 doublet of Aces: bezas (diminutive of ambesas), bezet;
 doublet of 2: double two (doublet de deux);
 doublet of 3: ternes;
 doublet of 4: carmes;
 doublet of 5: quines;
 doublet of 6: sonnez ("ring the bells").

Moves 
The following rules apply to moving the men:

 For each die a man may be moved by the number of points equal to the number of pips on the die. In order for a move to be possible, the end point must not be blocked by an opponent's man.
 If a player decides to move a man the total number of pips on both dice, called "playing all on one" (jouer tout d'une), both the end point and the intermediate point or points must not be blocked by one or more adverse men.
 A doublet is not played twice (as it is in backgammon). With a doublet, it is only possible to move a maximum of two men, each by the value of one die.
 The rules on occupying rest corners and moving men on the return run must also be respected.
 The overriding rule is that the pips of both dice must be used to move men when possible. If that is not possible, the higher one must be used if possible, otherwise the lower one. If neither can be used, a player misses a turn.
 The rule "piece touched, piece moved" is mandatory unless the player has announced beforehand: "I dub" (j'adoube). Dubbing is used in trictrac to arrange men and can only be used to correct a misaligned man or move one slightly to see the colour of the point below.

A "false hit" (fausse case) occurs when a man has been illegally moved. In the event of a false hit, the opponent may choose where the wrongly moved man is to be placed.

Dice throws 

The following rules apply to dice throws, also called dice rolls:

 On a dice roll:
 – a flat die resting on a man is good;
 – An inclined die resting on a man or a board rail is good if accepted by both players. Otherwise, the player who views it as good must place a third die on top and if this 'witness die' does not slide off the tested die is good;
 – a die completely or partially on a jeton is good;
 – a die that has jumped into the other compartment is good, provided the above conditions are met;
 – a die outside the board or on one of its rails is bad;
 – a die ending up on another is bad.

 When a die is bad, the player must re-roll both.
 If a player rolls before the opponent has finished moving men, the dice are good and the opponent may finish moving without being penalized for a false hit, since the first player has already started the next turn;
 If a player rolls the dice and they touch the opponent's hand after the opponent has finished moving men, the player may adjudge the move good or bad as desired.

Broken die 
Today, a die is said to be "broken" (cassé) when it is severely tilted. This was not always the case: there was one rule for a broken die, and another for a cocked (tilted) die. The dice could break due because they were mostly made of bone and were thrown quite violently against the opposite rail of the board. If a die broke in two and only one man showed its points, the throw was good.

Rest corners 
A player's rest corner (coin de repos) is point number 11. Its occupation and release are subject to the following rules:

 To place more than two men on a rest corner, the player whose corner it is must first take it with two men simultaneously. The rest corner may then receive extra men – one by one or two by two – during subsequent throws;
 Taking the corner is not compulsory unless it is the only legal move possible;
 To release the rest corner, all builders (extra men) are moved off first, and then the last two are removed on the same dice throw;
 A player may retake the rest corner having released it;
 A player may never take the opponent's rest corner;
 An empty rest corner – of either player – may be used as an intermediate point when moving a man by the sum of two dice.

There are two ways to take a rest corner:
 "Naturally" (naturellement) by placing two men directly on it. This is also called taking it "by effect" (par effet) or "directly" (directement);
 "By force" (par puissance), by being able to move two men directly to the unoccupied rest corner of the opponent. In the same turn, the player moves the two men to the opponent's rest corner and then immediately to his or her own rest corner.

Further rules apply to taking the rest corner:
 Extra men may be added to the rest corner by effect but not by force;
 If a rest corner can be taken either naturally or by force, it must be taken naturally.
 Taking a rest corner does not score.

From a tactical point of view, to have more chances of taking your rest corner, it is worth having one or two builders (extra men) on points 5 and 6 while the opponent's corner is still empty, but when the opponent has taken it, it is better not to have too many on point 6. Under these conditions, these builders enable a die throw of "six" to be used. These advantageous positions for taking the rest corner led players to call points 5 and 6 'bourgeois corner'.

Points, holes and jans 
A round (partie entière or tour) in trictrac is played over twelve holes (parties simple or, more commonly, trous). Each time a player scores one or more holes, the corresponding peg is moved along the side rail of the board. The first hole is marked at the base of the talon, the twelfth at the base of the rest corner. When the peg of either player reaches the twelfth hole, the match is over and that player wins.

To score a hole a player must score twelve points. These points are earned in game situations called jans, but also from bearing off all a player's men and from the opponent's point-counting errors called "schools" (écoles).

Keeping track of the points scored is done on the board itself using three jetons, initially placed between the two talons against the end rail. This initial position corresponds to zero points.

Point scoring 

Trictrac points are always scored in twos; the score being indicated by placing a jeton at the following locations (see diagram – right):

 2 points: by the tip of point 1 (on the side nearest point 2);
 4 points: by the tip of point 3 (on the side nearest point 4);
 6 points: by the tip of point 5 (on the side nearest the bridge);
 8 points: by the tip of point 6 (on the side nearest the bridge);
 10 points: by the tip of point 11 (on the side nearest the end rail);
 12 points: at the start position between the two talons (a hole having been scored).

For example, Michelle has 6 points, her jeton is by the tip of point 5 on the side nearest the bridge (i.e. centre bar). If she scores 4 more points she moves her jeton to the tip of point 11 on the side by the end rail, indicating that she now has 10 points. If she now wins 2 more points, she will score 1 hole (or 2 in case of a lurch or bredouille) by moving her peg one hole further and replacing her jeton back at the start between the talons. In this example, Michelle announces what has just been scored: "1 (or 2) holes and none left over", but if instead of scoring 2 points she had scored 4 she would have marked her hole(s) and moved her jeton to the tip of point 1 by announcing "1 (or 2) holes and 2 points over".

The choice of the positions of the eighth and tenth points is justified by the need to leave enough room on the board to throw the dice without hitting the jetons.

Bredouille 
When a player starts from the talon and scores 12 points without the opponent scoring any, it is a 'lurch' and that player advances two holes. The lurch jeton – jeton de bredouille or simply bredouille – is a special jeton used to show when a lurch (double points) is on the cards.

A player who scores points while the opponent remains on zero, is said to be 'on lurch' (en bredouille) and a player reaching twelve points before the opponent scores any "wins the lurch" (gagne bredouille).

When one player scores 12 points while the other player's jeton is still on the talon, there is no need for the bredouille as it is obvious that the points have been scored without the other player getting off the mark. If, however, the first player does not reach 12 points, the second player may, in turn, be able to make a run of 12 and thus score two holes. In this case the first player's jeton will not be at the start, so to note that the second player is now 'on lurch', a second jeton, the  'bredouille' , is placed alongside the first.

If, subsequently, the first player were to score points before second player reaches 12, the lurch is no longer possible and the bredouille is returned to its starting point between the two talons. The second player has lost the opportunity for a lurch (débredouille). As the two players now each have only one jeton, whoever wins can only advance his peg one hole.

The peg has to be moved forward by twelve holes to win a match of trictrac.

Holding, going and games 
A player winning a partie (i.e. reaching 12 points and scoring a hole) on his dice roll, has the choice between continuing the current game or starting a new one:
 Holding, staying (tenir, rester): the player scores the remaining points and resets the opponent's to zero by replacing the opponent's jeton and, if deployed, the bredouille, by the talon rail. The game continues with alternating turns and the opponent scores points acquired on the last move of the partie just ended. The decision may be announced with "I'm holding" (je tiens) or "I'm staying" (je reste);
 Going, returning (s'en aller, renvoyer): the player places the three jetons by the talon rail, thus giving up his remaining points, and returning all men to the talon, the opponent doing likewise. The opponent cannot score any points gained on that go. The decision may be announced with "I'm going" (je m'en vais) or "I'm returning" (je renvoie). By going back the player acquires the privilege of the rolling first for the next move.

Any declaration or action to stay or go must be acted upon and is not revocable.

The period of play between two placements of the men on the talons is called a game (relève):
 The first game runs from the start of the whole round to the first 'return' (renvoi), which is when the player chooses to "go" and start a new game;
 The following ones go from one return to the next;
 The last game runs from the last return to the end of the round;
There is another type of return which is not related to  a player's decision but to the bearing off of the men.

Pavilion 

The 'pavilion' (pavillon) or 'standard' (étandard) is a small flag that plays the same role as the bredouille but for a whole round. At the very beginning of the round, the flag is placed between the two players' pegs on the talon bar.

When a player reaches the twelfth hole without the other having scored a single hole, this is called "winning the lurch" for the round (gagne le tour bredouille) or "winning a grand lurch" (gagner en grande bredouille). If the second player wins a hole before the first reaches the twelfth hole, the first is no longer able to win a grand lurch. However, the second player can now do so. To indicate this, the second player replaces his or her peg with the flag and continues to use it instead of the peg. If the second player reaches 12 holes before the first scores a hole again, the second player wins a grand lurch. But if the first prevents the 12-hole run by scoring a hole, the flag is removed and laid down next to the board to indicates that neither player can win a grand lurch in that round.

Winnings 
The game of trictrac was usually played for money and winning a round was valued at a multiple of the stake agreed between the players. The multiplier depended on the scoring scheme chosen:

The oldest:
 winning a normal game is worth a single stake.
 winning a lurch pays double;

The second:
 winning a normal game if the opponent has crossed the bridge (passé le pont) is a single stake.
 winning a normal game if the opponent has not crossed the bridge is pays 1½ times the stake;
 winning a lurch pays double;

The last one described in the 19th century:
 winning a normal game if the opponent has reached the sixth hole is worth a single stake;
 winning a normal game if the opponent has not reached the sixth hole pays double;
 winning a lurch with the flag pays triple;
 winning a lurch without the flag pays quadruple.

This method is more attractive because it gives the trailing player a chance to reduce the opponent's winnings up to the end. Nowadays, the stake is 1 point and a player's winnings are counted as a number of points depending on the method chosen.

Rare jans 
Jans are point scoring feats. 'Rare' jans (jans rare) can only be achieved at the very start of a game (relève). The actual score depends on whether the dice throw resulted in two singletons or a doublet. There are five rare jans:

 Jan de trois coups or jan de six tables
 Feat: awarded when the first three dice rolls allow the player to place one man on each of the six points after the talon.
 Score: 4 points. Note: it cannot be achieved with a doublet.
 Move: to score the player does not actually have to move the last two men to line them up with the first four. This jan can thus be scored 'by force' (puissance).
 Jan de deux tables
 Feat: awarded if, having only moved two men out of the talon, the dice roll allows one man to be moved to the player's rest corner and the other to the opponent's empty rest corner.
 Score: 4 points if achieved with singletons (two different die scores) or 6 points with a doublet.
 Move: The rules on the occupation of resting corners prohibit actually making this move, so it is a 'force jan'.
 Contre-jan de deux tables
 Feat: same as jan de deux tables but the opponent occupies his rest corner.
 Score: opponent scores 4 points (singleton) or 6 points (doublet).
 Move: same as jan de deux tables.
 Jan de mézéas
 Feat: awarded when, having released only two men from the talon which occupy his resting corner while that of the opponent is empty, the player rolls one or two aces.
 Score: 4 points (singleton) or 6 points (doublet).
 Move: same as jan de deux tables.
 Contre-jan de mezeas
 Feat: same as jan de mézéas but the opponent is already in his corner of rest.
 Score: the opponent earns 4 points (singleton) or 6 points (doublet).
 Move: same as jan de deux tables.

Filling jans 

The board is made up of four quarters each of six points. A 'filling' jan is made when a player has at least two men on each of the six points in any one of the following three quarters:

 Petit Jan: in the quarter containing the player's talon;
 Grand Jan: in the quarter with the player's rest corner;
 Jan de Retour: in the quarter with the opponent's talon.

The remaining quarter cannot be filled because a player may not occupy the opponent's rest corner. Filling a quarter is referred to as "making" it. A player must fill a quarter if able; failure to do so incurs 'school' and 'false hit' penalties.

On a singleton roll of the dice, when a player has only half a point to cover to fill the quarter, there may be three different ways of doing so: with only one man, with either of two men from two different points, or with one man played "all on one" using the sum of the two dice.
On a doublet roll, it is only possible to fill in one or two ways: with one man using one die or with one man using both dice. A player able to fill a quarter in more than one way has the choice. In the event that there is not one half point left to cover but two, it is only possible to fill in one way, only the last of the two men played actually filling the quarter.

For a filled jan, for each way it may be filled a player scores 4 points if the throw was a singleton and 6 points if it was a doublet.

Once a player has filled a quarter, the player must 'keep it full' (conserver son plein) if at all possible during the turns that follow, under pain of school and false hit penalties. When a player can no longer preserve a full quarter, the player 'breaks it' (il le rompt), but this may only be done if there is no other option.

If there is no choice but to preserve the quarter or keep it full it, the player scores 4 points for a singleton throw and 6 points for a doublet.

As always, points must be scored before touching the men or the school penalty is incurred.

Hitting opponent's men 
When one of a player's dice would enable a move onto a point occupied by the opponent with just one man, that man is said to be "hit". A man is hit directly if the distance to the opposing man equals the number of pips on one die, or indirectly if the distance equals the sum of the pips on both dice.

In trictrac, a hit man remains in place and the one that hit cannot join it because the movement rules don't allow it. Hitting an opponent's man is therefore always done 'by force'. A man can be hit in two ways:
 it is a good or true hit (battue à vrai) if the man is a) hit directly, or b) hit indirectly and the intermediate point is not occupied by more than one opposing man;
 it is a false hit (battue à faux) if it is indirectly hit and the intermediate point is occupied by two or more opposing men.

A man can suffer a true hit in up to three ways on a singleton throw, once or twice directly and once indirectly, and in either one or two ways on a doublet throw, once directly and once indirectly. It can never be falsely hit except in one way. For each way the opponent's man can be hit, the player earns the relevant points (see below). A man that suffers a true hit cannot suffer a false hit and vice versa, but in the same throw there can be a true hit and a false hit.

A true hit earns the player:
 by a singleton in either grand jan quarter, 2 points;
 by a doublet in either grand jan, 4 points;
 by a singleton in either petit jan, 4 points;
 by a doublet in either petit jans, 6 points.

A false hit earns the same points for the opponent as per the table above. The points gained by the player who rolled the dice are scored before any false hits are scored by the opponent, so that if the player who made the true hit wins a partie and "goes", thus ending the current game, his opponent can no longer score the points for false hits.

From a tactical point of view, the occupation of point no. 10 at the start of a game may prove hazardous, reducing the chances of making a grand jan and being able to hit the opponent's men. Its situation close to the return run, giving more possibilities to 'truly hit' the opponent's men in the petit jan quarter, often makes it the preferred point for beginners in trictrac despite the risks involved, which has led the players to christen it the "schoolchildren's point". Circumstances, in particular when the opponent is the only one to have taken his rest corner, can make the occupation of the point no. 10 favourable.

Hitting opponent's corner 
While a player may not occupy the adverse rest corner, it is possible to 'hit the corner' (battre le coin). To do so, the player's own rest corner must be taken and the opponent's rest corner must be empty.

Subject to these preconditions if, on a dice roll a player can 'virtually' move two men to the opponent's rest corner, the corner is hit. All the men able to move directly into the opponent's rest corner are eligible to participate in the hitting, except those occupying the player's rest corner. For the latter, only the builders (extra men) can contribute.

Hitting the opposite corner earns the player 4 points on a singleton throw and 6 points for a doublet. These points are gained by force, the opponent's corner can never actually be occupied. The opponent's corner is never falsely hit, so if both corners are occupied, neither player is able to hit the opponent's.

Bonus and powerless jans 

The bonus jan (jan de récompense) and powerless jan (jan qui ne peut) are two uncommon expressions. Nevertheless:

A bonus jan is earned by:
 A true hit on an opponent's man;
 A hit on the opponent's rest corner.

A powerless jan concedes points to the opponent when:
 There is a false hit on an opponent’s man;
 The player is unable ("powerless") to play the pips on one or both dice.

In the latter case, if the player is unable to move one or two men, his opponent scores 2 points for a "helpless man" (dame impuissant) or 4 points for two helpless men whether the roll was a doublet or two singletons.

If a player concedes points to his opponent for one or more helpless men, but at the same time preserves his grand jan, the player still scores for keeping the grand jan. This is called 'preservation by powerlessness' (conserver par impuissance). The overriding rule that calls for playing both dice and, if only one can be played, playing the higher must always be observed even if it means breaking up a filled quarter.

Bearing off 
A player who has moved all men to the last quarter, may 'bear off' i.e. take them off the board. However, the rules of filling and its preservation must be respected concerning the jan de retour.

Two methods of bearing off coexisted:
 The 'provincial' or slow method;
 The 'Parisian' or quick method.

The quick method prevailed. It is the same as in Backgammon and follows these rules:
 The end rail next to the talons is considered as a point;
 A man landing on the rail is borne off;
 A die roll greater than that necessary to move the furthest man to the rail is said to be 'overshooting' (excédant) and allows this man to be borne off;
 If it is not possible to bear a man off, the player has to make normal board moves.

Being the first player to bear off fifteen men scores 4 points (singleton) or 6 points (doublet).

If on the last move there is only one man left to go out and the amount of one die is sufficient, it does not affect the scoring and the second die is ignored. Once the points have been scored, the two players replace the men on the opposite talons. They therefore change the colour of their men with each game. If no hole was immediately won, the points acquired are retained by both players. The privilege of starting the next game goes to the one who bore his men off first.

The provincial method consisted in playing all that was playable on the board and only the men furthest from the talon were allowed to be borne off if the dice permitted. An exception was that a player who had made a jan de retour could preserve it by taking out his extra men if they could be moved exactly onto the end rail. The player could 'preserve by privilege' (conserver par privilège) in this way up to three times.

Obsolete jans 
Three ways to score points were abandoned in the first half of the 17th century:
 Jan de rencontre ("En man Jan")
 Feat: it could only occur on the very first move of the round made by the second player. If the latter obtained the same result of the dice as the first player, there was a jan de rencontre. This was justified by a concern for fairness by trying to restore the odds between the player who had obtained the lead by chance and his opponent. The jan de rencontre was not possible during the following games since the lead was not due to chance but to play.
 Score: 4 points (singleton) or 6 points (doublet)..
 Margot la fendue ("Saucy Margot")
 Feat: This saucy expression, meaning a woman of low virtue, was attributed to an opponent’s way of scoring points. When, on his roll of the dice, a player had a man on an empty point between two isolated men, half-points, of the opponent, it was a Margot la fendue.
 Score: the opponent scores 2 points (singleton) and 4 points (doublet).
 La pile de misère ("The pile of misery")
 Feat: a player who stacks 15 men on his or her rest corner due to an opponent's blocking the return run, this was a 'pile of misery' or 'pile of misfortune' (pile de malheur). This jan was extremely rare and intended to make an adversary open the way.
 Score: the player scores 4 points (singleton) and 6 points (doublet). Preserving the misery pile scored the same.

Today, these three jans can be played optionally by agreement between the players before the start of the round.

Scoring summary table 
The following summary table is based on Lalanne:

(n/a = non applicable)

Game structure 
A game of trictrac breaks down into elements or events:
 The round (tour) or match (partie entière) is made up of one or more games totalling 12 holes;
 A game (relève) = one or more parties. It starts when all men are returned to the talon because:
 – a player "goes" having won a partie;
 – a player bears off all his men;
 A partie (partie or partie simple) is when a player scores one or more holes;
 A hole (trou aka partie simple) is obtained by scoring twelve points;

Return run 
The return run (jeu de retour) begins when one of the players moves at least one of his men to the opponent's side. The movement of the men is restricted by the rules of the passage on the return run:

 A player may not move any man onto the return run as long as the opponent has the chance of making a petit jan;
 When the opponent can no longer make a petit jan but is still able to make a grand jan, men may not be placed in the third quarter, but any free points may be used to move men to the last quarter;
 When the opponent can no longer achieve a petit jan or a grand jan, the player may place his men on any free point of the 'return run' with the exception of the rest corner which can only be used, if empty, as an intermediate point.

Enfilade 
An enfilade is a significant run of successful holes in succession in a single game, typically about five to six holes in a row. It is the most sought after achievement in trictrac. It is the source of the French expression, now vulgar, 'to be enfiladed' (être enfilé  or se faire enfiler). It is most often realised when a player has made a grand jan while having three extra men far enough back to preserve it as long as possible and to score false hits, and at the same time the opponent can no longer make his own grand jan leaving gaps for the opposing extra men. To avoid being enfiladed, it is important to plan for it and sacrifice several holes to get the opponent to "go" and not lose the "turn" on the enfilade.

Infringements 

Gaming infringements are of two types:
 "False hits" i.e. incorrect moves of the men;
 "Schools" i.e. incorrect point scoring.

False hits and schools are always handled by the opponent of the offender, each player refereeing the other.

False hit 
When a player makes an illegal move, it is a "false hit" (fausse case). Generally speaking, a player is never allowed to retract a move. Picking up the men always signifies that you are 'going' after winning a partie. A player cannot make a false hit by hitting his opponent's men.

False hits occur when:
 a man has been moved by a number of points that do not match the value of one of the dice;
 a man has been moved to a point beyond the one where it should have been moved for the sum of the two dice;
 the rest corner was taken by force when it could have been taken by effect;
 a quarter was not filled when it could have been;
 a filled quarter was not preserved when it could have been;
 the rules of passage on the return run were not respected in that a man was played into a quarter that the opponent could still fill;
 a player has placed a single man in either of the rest corners.

Due to the "piece touched, piece played" rule, it is not always necessary for a man to have actually been moved for a false hit to occur. One just has to work out where it can end up.

The rule "piece released, piece played" prohibits the player from changing the situation once the man has been let go of. All false hits must be corrected by the opponent in accordance with the rules of movement. The opponent is only master of those men that contributed to the wrong move.

The treatment of the false hit depends on the situation:
 A man has been moved a number of points that do not match the value of one of the dice:
 – If a man is placed on a point that does not correspond to any of the moves allowed by the dice, the opponent may leave the man where it is, or move it to where it should have gone;
 – If two men were wrongly played together, the opponent can leave them where they are or rectify the position of one or both men, by moving them by the minimum amount allowable by the values of the dice. The opponent can also return the two men to their initial position and have only one played for the sum of the two dice.
 A man has been placed on a point beyond where it should have been for the sum of the two dice:
 – If it is the first man and the second has not yet been touched, the two dice are considered played and the opponent can prohibit the movement of a second man leaving the first as it is or by correcting its position for the sum of the two dice;
 – If two men have been played, one legally, the opponent may leave the other as it is or rectify the incorrectly played one based on the value of the second die.
 A player took the rest corner by power when it could have been taken by effect:
 – The opponent can return a man to its original place and have the other moved for the sum of the two dice, subject to the rules around the return run;
 – If that is not possible, the opponent must return the two men to their original places and let the offender move as desired. However, the player is not allowed to take the rest corner on this go unless no other solution is possible.
 If a player has not filled a quarter when able, his opponent has the choice of leaving things as they are or forcing the player to fill it. The false hit is counted the instant a man is touched and the quarter can no longer be filled. In addition, the offender is 'sent to school'.
 If a player did not preserve quarter when able, the opponent can leave things as they are or let the offender replay as desired without breaking the quarter. The false hit is counted the instant the breaking man is touched. In addition, the offending player is sent to school.
 The rules of passage on the return run have not been respected:
 – If a player has moved a man on the return run into a quarter (petit jan or grand jan) that the opponent could still fill, the latter must if possible make the offender replay correctly
 – If, however, the offender realises his mistake before the opponent rolls the dice, it may be corrected without penalty;
 – If neither player has seen the false hit in the third quarter and the opponent only realises it after having thrown the dice, the offender may be forced to play the offending man on the next turn into the last quarter. But once this next move is over, or the grand jan is no longer possible, the opponent can no longer enforce this;
 – If neither player has seen the false hit in the fourth quarter, the opponent having rolled his dice, it is no longer possible to take action;
 – If a player has touched a man that ends up in his empty rest corner or that of the opponent, the latter may force the player to move this man to the return run if that is possible or else let the player rethrow and replay as desired.
 If a player has placed a single man in either empty rest corner, the opponent cannot leave it as it is and must have it replayed legally. If this is not possible the opponent simply puts it back in its original place and lets the player move another  man.

The strict rules governing false hits are due to the fact that points scored by the dice roll affect the opponent as well as the player who rolled.

Schools 

In trictrac a 'school' (école) is any error in scoring points on one's own turn. The player at fault loses points corresponding to the difference between those actually scored and those that should have been scored. The opponent "sends him to school" without being required to give the reason. There are four basic cases:

 Underscoring (l'école par moin) occurs when a player scores fewer points than earned. The school is claimed as soon as the player at fault touches one of his men or, on a jan which cannot, when the player has thrown the dice. The opponent sends the offending player to school and scores the point difference;
 Overscoring (l'école par trop) occurs when a player scores more points than earned. The school is claimed as soon as the offending player has placed his man beyond the point it should have been moved to. The opponent sends the offender to school and scores the excess points;
 A filling error (l'école liée au remplissage) occurs when a player does not fill a quarter when able. The school is claimed as soon as the offending player touches one of his positioned men in such a way that the quarter cannot be filled on that go. The offender has also made a false hit and if the opponent forces the offender to fill, this does not affect the school penalty;
 A preserving error (l'école liée à la conservations d'un plein) occurs when a player does not preserve a full quarter when able. The school is claimed as soon as the offender touches a man that breaks up the quarter. The opponent claims the points scored by the offending player and scores the points for preservation instead of the player. The offender has also made a false hit and if the opponent forces the offender to keep his quarter full, this does not affect the school penalty.

For greater clarity in the game, it is best to wait before scoring the school until the offending player has either touched one of his men or rolled the dice, as the case may be.

Any school can be contested by the player 'being sent to school' according to a procedure which may include two phases:

 False school (fausse école): when a player is in error in sending his opponent to school, the opponent goes to school instead. This is called a false school. The opponent then sends to the school the one who made the false school claim by deducting the points improperly scored replacing his own jeton in the original place and then adding the points for the false school;
 School raise (l'augmentation d'école): if, following a declaration of "false school", the first player proves that there was indeed a valid school, that player scores a school raise, by restoring the jetons to the state of the first school and doubling the school points won. To avoid an escalation, the player applying the school increase is required to explain why there was a school and, if wrong, that player would submit to the rule of the false school one last time.

Schools should always benefit the one who did not commit them without being able to abuse them. With this in mind, three rules are applicable when dealing with schools:
   
 There is no "school of schools" (école d'école): players are never compelled to score a school, but may ignore it completely;
 It is acceptable to correct the opponent's mistake without scoring school points;
 School points must be scored in their entirety, a player who has been sent to school can force his opponent to do so if the opponent has made a mistake as well.

See also 
 History of board games
 Tables games
 Backgammon
 Jacquet
 Libro de los juegos – one of the most important documents in the history of board games

Footnotes

References

Literature 

Treatises on trictrac

 de Jollivet, Euverte, sieur de Votilley (1656), L’Excellent Jeu du Tricque-trac, Paris: Jean Promé's widow, revision of the new 1st edn. of 1634). (ed. of 1635, ed. of 1639)
Note: On the title page of the Jean Promé edition, it states "de Jollivet", but on the following page, "Le libraire au reader", only "Monsieur Jollyvet" followed by "Sieur de Votilley".
 _ (1715), Le Jeu du Trictrac, Enrichi de Figures Avec les Jeux du Revertier, du Toute-Table, du Tourne-Case, des Dames Rabattues, du Plain, et du Toc., 3rd revised, corrected and expanded edn. Paris: Henry Charpentier (1st edn. 1698, 2nd edn. 1701).
 [Soumille, Bernard Laurent], Le Grand Trictrac, Giffart, Paris, 1756, edn. identical to the 1st ed. of 1738 at Avignon. (ed. of 1739).
 _, Principes du Jeu de Trictrac, Guillyn, Paris, 1749.
 M. L'Abbé S*** [Soumille, Bernard Laurent], Le Grand Trictrac, Alexandre Giroud, Avignon, 1756, 2nd rev. edn. (1st edn. 1738, Avignon F. Girard & D. Seguin).
 M. L'Abbé S*** [Soumille, Bernard Laurent], Le Grand Trictrac, de Hansy, 1766, reprint of the 1756 edn at Avignon.
 M.J.M.F. [Fallavel], Le Jeu du Trictrac, Nyon, Paris, 1776.
 s.n., Le Trictrac Combiné, s.l., s.d. (c. 1780).
 [Guiton, N.] (1822), Traité Complet du Jeu de Trictrac, 2nd rev. edn., Barrois l’Aîné (1st edn.. 1816).
 [Lepeintre, Pierre-Marie Michel] (1818), Cours Complet de Trictrac avec un Abrégé du Gammon, du Jacquet et du Garanguet., Paris: Guillaume.
 J.L. [Lelasseux-Lafosse, Julien], Le Jeu de Trictrac rendu facile, Ledoyen, Paris, 1852.

Other sources

External links 
 Rules for the Game of Trictrac in English by David Levy.
 Trictrac (Grand Trictrac) rules in English at Backgammon Galore!
 Le Jeu de Trictrac comprehensive rules in French by Lalanne.

Tables games
Traditional board games
French board games